Kamushki is a planned Moscow Railway station on the Line D4 of the Moscow Central Diameters. It will open in 2023.

References

Railway stations in Moscow
Railway stations of Moscow Railway